is a Japanese football player who plays for Vegalta Sendai.

Club statistics
Updated to 18 February 2019.

Reserves performance

References

External links

Profile at Consadole Sapporo

1994 births
Living people
Association football people from Hokkaido
Japanese footballers
J1 League players
J2 League players
J3 League players
Hokkaido Consadole Sapporo players
Shogo Nakahara
Gamba Osaka players
Gamba Osaka U-23 players
V-Varen Nagasaki players
J.League U-22 Selection players
Vegalta Sendai players
Association football midfielders
Sportspeople from Sapporo